William Hoag (November 18, 1870 – August 19, 1953) was an American lawyer, state legislator, and college football player and coach. A Republican, he was a member of the Massachusetts House of Representatives in 1907 and 1908.

Hoag played college football at Harvard University during the 1892 season. He graduated from Harvard in 1894. Hoag served as the head football coach at Bowdoin College in 1896 and at Bates College from 1897 to 1901.

Hoag died on August 19, 1953, as his home in Reading, Massachusetts.

References

External links
 

1870 births
1953 deaths
19th-century players of American football
Bates Bobcats football coaches
Boston University School of Law alumni
Bowdoin Polar Bears football coaches
Harvard Crimson football players
Massachusetts lawyers
Republican Party members of the Massachusetts House of Representatives
People from Lynn, Massachusetts
People from Reading, Massachusetts
Coaches of American football from Massachusetts
Players of American football from Massachusetts